Sam Yot is a four-way intersection of Charoen Krung and Maha Chai Roads in the area of Wang Burapha Phirom Subdistrict, Phra Nakhon District, Bangkok, and also as the name of the surrounding its location.

Its name "Sam Yot", which translates to "three peaks", refers to the three peaks of the city gate. It was one of the outer city gates of the Grand Palace built since the reign of King Phutthayotfa Chulalok (Rama I) during early Rattanakosin period. This gate has three summits and one of them was the passageway of Charoen Krung Road, therefore being called "Sam Yot" in Thai. Later, in the reign of King Chulalongkorn (Rama V), when Bangkok was growing, therefore have to expand the road. The Sam Yot Gate have to be demolished.

At that time, Sam Yot considered to be a very active area and also has a status as an amphoe (district) of Phra Nakhon Province (now Bangkok) as well, since it was located near a major commercial districts, Saphan Han and Woeng Nakhon Khasem.  It was also the location of a legal gambling den, called "Huai Ko Kho" (a type of Thai lottery).

During the reign of King Prajadhipok (Rama VII), Sam Yot were reduced to just tambon (sub-district).

Currently, Sam Yot considered as the fifth intersection of Charoen Krung Road, the first international standard road in Thailand, after Saphan Mon, Si Kak Phraya Si, Chaloem Krung, and Unakan. It is located near Wang Burapha, Sala Chalermkrung Royal Theatre, Romaneenart Park and Bangkok Corrections Museum. From here, Charoen Krung Road heads to the Damrong Sathit Bridge, more commonly known as Saphan Lek over Khlong Ong Ang on the boundary between Ban Bat Subdistrict, Pom Prap Sattru Phai District (left) and Samphanthawong Subdistrict, Samphanthawong District (right). The next intersection is S.A.B. Intersection.

The area is served by the Sam Yot Station of MRT Subway, whose Blue Line runs under Charoen Krung Road, which is in Bangkok's old town zone. It opened for the first day on July 29, 2019.

References

Phra Nakhon district
Road junctions in Bangkok
Neighbourhoods of Bangkok